Horti  is a village in the southern state of Karnataka, India. It is located in the Indi taluk of Vijayapur district in Karnataka.

Demographics
 India census, Horti had a population of 7662 with 4121 males and 3541 females.

See also
 Bijapur district
 Districts of Karnataka

References

External links
 http://Bijapur.nic.in/

Villages in Bijapur district, Karnataka